The year 2020 was the 10th year in the history of the ONE Championship, a mixed martial arts, kickboxing and muay thai promotion based in Singapore.

Background
Chatri Sityodtong announced that ONE Championship intended to do 50 events in 2020.

ONE Championship 2020 Awards
The following fighters won the ONE Championship year-end awards for 2020:
ONE Championship Fight of the Year 2020: Martin Nguyen vs. Thanh Le 
ONE Championship Knockout of the Year 2020: Thanh Le against Martin Nguyen 
ONE Championship Submission of the Year 2020: Reinier de Ridder against Aung La Nsang 
ONE Championship Breakthrough of the Year 2020: Allycia Rodrigues

List of events

ONE Infinity

ONE Championship

Road to ONE

ONE Hero Series

ONE Warrior Series

Grand Prix Participant

4-Man Muay Thai Bantamweight 66 kg GP Participant
  Saemapetch Fairtex
  Rodlek P.K. Saenchaimuaythaigym
  Kulabdam Sor.Jor.Piek-U-Thai
  Sangmanee Sor Tienpo

Grand Prix bracket

ONE Bantamweight Muay Thai Tournament bracket

 Rodlek P.K. Saenchaimuaythaigym replaced injured Saemapetch Fairtex at the final.

ONE Championship: A New Tomorrow

ONE Championship: A New Tomorrow (also known as ONE Championship 106: Rodtang vs. Haggerty 2) was a combat sport event held by ONE Championship on January 10, 2020 at the IMPACT Arena in Bangkok, Thailand.

Background
The event featured a rematch between Rodtang Jitmuangnon and Jonathan Haggerty for the ONE Muay Thai Flyweight Championship as the event headliner. Haggerty lost their previous fight by a unanimous decision. The co-main even featured the ONE Atomweight Kickboxing and Muay Thai champion Stamp Fairtex in an MMA bout against Puja Tomar.

Results

ONE Championship: Fire & Fury

ONE Championship: Fire & Fury (also known as ONE Championship 107: Pacio vs.  Silva) was a combat sport event held by ONE Championship on January 31, 2020, at the Mall of Asia Arena in Pasay, Philippines.

Background
Eduard Folayang was scheduled to face Ahmed Mujtaba, but Mujtaba was forced off the card on January 16 with an injury. Pieter Buist served as Mujtaba replacement, takes short notice fight against Folayang.

Results

ONE Championship: Warrior's Code

ONE Championship: Warrior's Code (also known as ONE Championship 108) was a combat sport event held by ONE Championship on February 7, 2020, at the Istora Senayan in Jakarta, Indonesia.

Background
The ONE Muay Thai Featherweight Championship bout between Phetmorakot Petchyindee Academy and Jamal Yusupov was expected for ONE Championship: Warrior’s Code main event. However, on January 30, Yusupov pulled out of the bout due to an injury. The Russian veteran, has been replaced by Thailand’s Detrit Sathian in the main event for the ONE Muay Thai Featherweight Championship. Detrit was later replaced by fellow Thai Pongsiri PK. Saenchaimuaythaigym, who took the fight on two days' notice.

Bi Nguyen was forced to withdraw from her bout with Itsuki Hirata due to an elbow injury sustained during training. Nyrene Crowley stepped in on short notice to face Hirata.

Results

ONE Warrior Series 10

ONE Warrior Series 10 was a combat sport event held by ONE Championship on February 19, 2020, in Kallang, Singapore.

Background

Results

ONE Championship: King of the Jungle

ONE Championship: King of the Jungle (also known as ONE Championship 109: Stamp vs. Todd 2) was  a combat sport event held by ONE Championship on February 28, 2020, at the Singapore Indoor Stadium in Kallang, Singapore.

Background
ONE: King of the Jungle was headlined by a title fight between the reigning ONE Kickboxing Women's Atomweight Champion Stamp Fairtex and Janet Todd. Stamp had previously beaten Todd to win the ONE Atomweight Muay Thai World Title. The co-main event saw Sam-A Gaiyanghadao face Rocky Ogden for the inaugural ONE Muay Thai Strawweight Championship.

Due to the COVID-19 pandemic, this event was held behind closed doors.

Results

ONE Infinity 1 (Cancelled)

ONE Infinity 1 was expected to be a combat sport event held by ONE Championship in Manila, Philippines. The event was cancelled due to the COVID-19 pandemic.

Background
The event was originally expected to take place in Chongqing, China on April 11. However, on February 6, the event was moved to the Istora Senayan in Jakarta, Indonesia due to the COVID-19 pandemic. Next the event was once again rescheduled, this time for 29 May in Manila, Philippines. The event was cancelled due to the COVID-19 pandemic.

Former UFC Flyweight Champion Demetrious Johnson was handed a shot at reigning ONE Flyweight Champion, Adriano Moraes.

A ONE Kickboxing Light Heavyweight Championship bout between current champion Roman Kryklia and former SUPERKOMBAT Super Cruiserweight Champion Andrei Stoica was slated to serve as the event co-headliner.

Fight Card

ONE Hero Series 13

ONE Hero Series 13 was a combat sport event held by ONE Championship on June 20, 2020, in Shanghai, China.

Background

Results

ONE Hero Series 14

ONE Hero Series 14 was a combat sport event held by ONE Championship on June 21, 2020, in Shanghai, China.

Background

Results

ONE Championship: No Surrender

ONE Championship: No Surrender (also known as ONE Championship 110) was a combat sport event held by ONE Championship on July 31, 2020, at the IMPACT Arena in Bangkok, Thailand.

Background
ONE: No Surrender featured two title bouts: Rodtang Jitmuangnon was scheduled to defend the  ONE Muay Thai Flyweight Championship against Petchdam Petchyindee Academy and Phetmorakot Petchyindee Academy was scheduled to defend the ONE Muay Thai Featherweight Championship against Yodsanklai Fairtex.

The main card also featured a kickboxing superfight between Superbon Banchamek and Sitthichai Sitsongpeenong.

Results

ONE Championship: No Surrender 2

ONE Championship: No Surrender 2 (also known as ONE Championship 111) was a combat sport event held by ONE Championship on July 31, 2020, at the IMPACT Arena in Bangkok, Thailand. It was first broadcast on August 14, 2020.

Background
The Bantamweight Muay Thai Tournament Semi-Finals bout between Saemapetch Fairtex and Rodlek P.K. Saenchaimuaythaigym was scheduled as the main event for ONE: No Surrender 2.

In the co-main event, the former WBC Muaythai and World Muaythai Council champion Mehdi Zatout was scheduled to fight Victor Pinto.

Bonus awards

The following fighter was awarded bonus: 
 Knockout of the Night: Akihiro Fujisawa

Results

ONE Championship: No Surrender 3

ONE Championship: No Surrender 3 (also known as ONE Championship 112) was a combat sport event held by ONE Championship on July 31, 2020, at the IMPACT Arena in Bangkok, Thailand. It was first broadcast on August 21, 2020.

Background
Bonus awards

The following fighter was awarded bonus: 
 Knockout of the Night: Kulabdam Sor.Jor.Piek-U-Thai

Results

ONE Championship: A New Breed

ONE Championship: A New Breed (also known as ONE Championship 113) was a combat sport event held by ONE Championship on August 28, 2020, at the IMPACT Arena in Bangkok, Thailand.

Background
This will be the fourth consecutive event ONE Championship has held in Bangkok and will be headlined by a bout between the current Atomweight Muay Thai champion Stamp Fairtex and Allycia Rodrigues. Additionally, Kulabdam Sor.Jor.Piek-U-Thai was expected to fight Saemapetch Fairtex, however Saemapetch suffered an injury before the bout and was replaced by Rodlek P.K. Saenchaimuaythaigym.

Results

Road to ONE 3: Tokyo Fight Night

Road to ONE 3: Tokyo Fight Night was a combat sport event held by ONE Championship in partnership with Shooto on September 10, 2020, at the Tsutaya O-East in Tokyo, Japan.

Background

Results

ONE Championship: A New Breed 2

ONE Championship: A New Breed 2 (also known as ONE Championship 114) was a combat sport event held by ONE Championship on August 28, 2020, at the IMPACT Arena in Bangkok, Thailand. It was first broadcast on September 11, 2020.

Background
A fight between the former ONE Muay Thai Featherweight title challenger Pongsiri PK.Saenchaimuaythaigym and the current WBC Muaythai Super Lightweight champion Sean Clancy was announced as the main event.

A kickboxing bout between Superlek Kiatmuu9 and Fahdi Khaled was announced as the co-main event. An additional fight in the ONE Super Series will feature Supergirl Jaroonsak Muaythai and Milagros Lopez at 53.7 kg catchweight. Two mixed martial arts bouts at lightweight (77 kg) were announced, pitting Abu Muslim Alikhanov vs. Pascal Jaskiewiez and Witchayakorn Niamthanom vs. Khalid Friggini. A 67.5 kg catchweight mixed martial arts fight between Prach Buapa and Brogan Stewart-Ng was announced as well.

Results

ONE Championship: A New Breed 3

ONE Championship: A New Breed 3 (also known as ONE Championship 115) was a combat sport event held by ONE Championship on August 28, 2020, at the IMPACT Arena in Bangkok, Thailand. It was first broadcast on September 18, 2020.

Background

Results

ONE Championship: Reign of Dynasties

ONE Championship: Reign of Dynasties (also known as ONE Championship 116) was a combat sport event held by ONE Championship on October 9, 2020, at the Singapore Indoor Stadium in Kallang, Singapore.

Background
ONE: ‘Reign of Dynasties’ will be headlined by a title fight between the current ONE Muay Thai Strawweight champion Sam-A Gaiyanghadao and Josh Tonna, who is currently on a two fight win streak. The card will also feature an MMA bout between the undefeated prospect Aleksi Toivonen, and the #5 ranked flyweight Reece McLaren.

Former ONE Strawweight champion Dejdamrong Sor Amnuaysirichoke is scheduled to have his first fight of 2020 against Getu Hexi.

This event marks ONE's return to Singapore, for the first time since the beginning of the COVID-19 pandemic.

Results

ONE Championship: Reign of Dynasties 2

ONE Championship: Reign of Dynasties 2 (also known as ONE Championship 117) was a combat sport event held by ONE Championship on October 9, 2020, at the Singapore Indoor Stadium in Kallang, Singapore. It was first broadcast on October 16, 2020.

Background
ONE: Reign of Dynasties 2 will be headlined by a kickboxing bout between Hiroki Akimoto and Zhang Chenglong. The co-main event will feature a fight between the former three weight Lumpini Stadium champion Sagetdao Petpayathai and Zhang Chunyu.

results

ONE Championship: Inside the Matrix

ONE Championship: Inside the Matrix (also known as ONE Championship 118: N Sang vs. De Ridder) was a combat sport event held by ONE Championship on October 30, 2020, at the Singapore Indoor Stadium in Kallang, Singapore.

Background
ONE Championship CEO Chatri Sityodtong announced, four weeks before the event, that "Inside the Matrix" would feature four title bouts: Aung La Nsang would attempt to defend his Middleweight title for the fourth time against the undefeated Reinier de Ridder, Christian Lee would defend his Lightweight title for the first time against the undefeated prospect Iuri Lapicus, Martin Nguyen would defend his Featherweight title against Thanh Le, and Xiong Jingnan would defend her Strawweight strap in rematch with Tiffany Teo.

The event will be third in a row to take place in Singapore, following the relaxation of measures meant to combat the COVID-19 pandemic.

Former ONE Lightweight champion Eduard Folayang is scheduled to fight Antonio Caruso. Both fighters have most recently lost to Pieter Buist.

A women's atomweight bout between Ritu Phogat and Nou Srey Pov was announced as the sixth fight on the card.

Results

ONE Championship: Inside the Matrix 2

ONE Championship: Inside the Matrix 2 (also known as ONE Championship 119) was a combat sport event held by ONE Championship on October 30, 2020, at the Singapore Indoor Stadium in Kallang, Singapore. It was first broadcast on November 6, 2020.

Background
ONE: Inside the Matrix 2 will be headlined by a welterweight title fight, as the reigning champion Kiamrian Abbasov is scheduled to defend his title for the first time against James Nakashima.

In the co-main event, the #4 ranked lightweight Timofey Nastyukhin will face the #3 ranked Pieter Buist.

In the remaining three MMA matches, the #4 ranked flyweight Yuya Wakamatsu is scheduled to fight Kim Kyu Sung, Eko Roni Saputra  is scheduled to fight Ramon Gonzales, likewise at flyweight. The #2 ranked women's atomweight Meng Bo will face Priscilla Gaol.

A catchweight muay thai bout between Joseph Lasiri and Rocky Ogden was previously scheduled for ONE: Inside the Matrix 2.However, on November 4, the bout was removed from the card and the bout was rescheduled to a future card.

Results

ONE Championship: Inside the Matrix 3

ONE Championship: Inside the Matrix 3 (also known as ONE Championship 120) was a combat sport event held by ONE Championship on October 30, 2020, at the Singapore Indoor Stadium in Kallang, Singapore. It was first broadcast on November 13, 2020.

Background
Former ONE Bantamweight champion Kevin Belingon is scheduled to fight the #5 ranked bantamweight John Lineker. The fight will serve as the event headliner.

In the co-main, former ONE Flyweight champion Geje Eustaquio is scheduled to fight the former Road FC interim flyweight champion Min Jong Song. A middleweight bout between Murad Ramazanov and Hiroyuki Tetsuka was announced, as well as a flyweight bout between the #5 ranked Lito Adiwang and Hiroba Minowa. Two time ADCC champion Yuri Simões will fight Fan Rong.

results

ONE Championship: Inside the Matrix 4

ONE Championship: Inside the Matrix 4 (also known as ONE Championship 121) was a combat sport event held by ONE Championship on October 30, 2020, at the Singapore Indoor Stadium in Kallang, Singapore. It was first broadcast on November 20, 2020.

Background
ONE: Inside the Matrix 4 was headlined by a kickboxing bout between the former ONE Kickboxing Strawweight title challenger Wang Junguang and Aslanbek Zikreev.

In the co-main event, Joseph Lasiri fought Rocky Ogden. Bruno Pucci returned from a year long layoff to face Kwon Won Il.

Former Shooto Featherweight champion Ryogo Takahashi fought the undefeated prospect Yoon Chang Min. The sole WMMA bout saw Maira Mazar face Choi Jeong Yun. Although Choi was undefeated, it was her first fight in over three years.

Results

Road to ONE 4: Fair Fight 13

Road to ONE 4: Fair Fight 13 was a Kickboxing event held by ONE Championship in partnership with Fair Fight promotion, on November 28, 2020, at the Akademiya Yedinoborstv Rmk in Yekaterinburg, Russia.

Background
Road to ONE 4 will be ONE Championship's first event held in Russia.

A four-man tournament will be held in the 66 kg weight class, featuring Tamerlan Bashirov, Viktor Mikhailov, Vladimir Kuzmin and Maxim Petkevich.

Sher Mamazulunov is scheduled to fight Dmitry Valent in a kickboxing bout at 84 kg.

Results

ONE Championship: Big Bang

ONE Championship: Big Bang (also known as ONE Championship 122) was a combat sport event held by ONE Championship on December 4, 2020, at the Singapore Indoor Stadium in Kallang, Singapore.

Background
ONE: Big Bang will be headlined by a featherweight kickboxing bout between Marat Grigorian and Ivan Kondratev.

The #5 ranked featherweight Garry Tonon is scheduled to fight the former ONE Featherweight title challenger Koyomi Matsushima.

Former Glory lightweight champion Marat Grigorian is scheduled to fight Ivan Kondratev, in his debut with the organization.

In the sole WMMA bout, Ritu Phogat is scheduled to fight Jomary Torres.

A Heavyweight bout between newcomer Amir Aliakbari and Islam Abasov was previously scheduled for ONE: Big Bang. However, on November 25, the bout was removed from the card because Abasov was arrested and detained in Moscow after a road conflict.

Danny Kingad was scheduled to face Kairat Akhmatov, but Kingad was forced off the card on November 30 after one of his cornermen tested positive for COVID-19. The bout has been scrapped.

As a number of fighters withdrew, several changes took place on the card. The featherweight matchup between Marat Grigorian and Ivan Kondratev was promoted to the main event. Anderson Silva replaced Roman Kryklia as Murat Aygun's opponent, and a featherweight fight between Andy Souwer and Zhang Chunyu was added. A women's atomweight MMA bout between Jihin Radzuan and Bi Nguyen was later added as well.

Roman Kryklia was scheduled to defend his ONE Kickboxing Light Heavyweight title against promotional newcomer Murat Aygün in the ONE championship: Big Bang Headliner, but Kryklia has to withdraw from the bout when one of his coaches tested positive for COVID.Anderson Silva was pulled from a planned ONE Championship: Big Bang 2 bout with Masoud Safari, and faced Aygün on the ONE Championship: Big Bang card.

Results

ONE Championship: Big Bang 2

ONE Championship: Big Bang 2 (also known as ONE Championship 123) was a combat sport event held by ONE Championship on December 4, 2020, at the Singapore Indoor Stadium in Kallang, Singapore. It was first broadcast on December 11, 2020.

Background
ONE: Big Bang 2 will be headlined by a Muay Thai fight between Taiki Naito and Jonathan Haggerty. In the co-main event, Nieky Holzken will return from a year long layoff to take on Elliot Compton.

Errol Zimmerman returns from a two-year hiatus from kickboxing to fight Rade Opacic. In the remaining MMA bouts, Tetsuya Yamada is scheduled to fight Kim Jae Woong, and Ali Motamed will fight Chen Rui.

Masoud Safari was scheduled to face Anderson Silva, but was removed from the card when Silva stepped up to face Aygün on ONE Championship: Big Bang card.

A welterweight fight between Agilan Thani and Tyler McGuire was later added.

Results

Road to ONE 5: WSS

Road to ONE 5: WSS was a Muay Thai event held by ONE Championship in partnership with World Siam Stadium (WSS) on December 7, 2020, at the World Siam Stadium in Bangkok, Thailand.

Background
The event will be headlined by a fight between the reigning Rajadamnern Stadium 126 lb champion Petchpangan Teeded99 and Wanchana Nor Narisson. They have met on two previous occasions, with each fighter winning once.

Results

ONE Championship: Collision Course

ONE Championship: Collision Course (also known as ONE Championship 124) was a combat sport event held by ONE Championship on December 18, 2020, at the Singapore Indoor Stadium in Kallang, Singapore.

Background
A ONE Kickboxing Light Heavyweight Championship bout between current champion Roman Kryklia and former SUPERKOMBAT Super Cruiserweight Champion Andrei Stoica was slated to serve as the event headliner. This fight was previously postponed three times in 2020 due to the COVID-19 pandemic.

However, the Ukrainian was rescheduled for this event. On December 9, it is announced that Kryklia will defend his belt against Stoica. The Romanian will finally get his title shot but on short notice. Stoica was announced only 2 weeks before the event and at that time he had cut weight to make 95 kilogram weight class for a fight in Romania.

In the co-main event, the reigning ONE Muay Thai Bantamweight champion Nong-O Gaiyanghadao will defends his title against the ONE Bantamweight Muay Thai Tournament winner Rodlek P.K. Saenchaimuaythaigym.

After a 2 years hiatus the undefeated lightweight contender Lowen Tynanes will make his comeback against the former ONE Featherweight champion Marat Gafurov.

The #3 ranked bantamweight Yusup Saadulaev is scheduled to fight the undefeated Troy Worthen. In the flyweight division, Xie Wei will take on Chan Rothana.

Results

ONE Championship: Collision Course 2

ONE Championship: Collision Course 2 (also known as ONE Championship 125) was a combat sport event held by ONE Championship on December 18, 2020, at the Singapore Indoor Stadium in Kallang, Singapore. It was first broadcast on December 25, 2020.

Background
ONE: Collision Course II will be headlined by a muay thai match between Jamal Yusupov and Samy Sana. In the co-main, the #3 ranked flyweight Kairat Akhmetovi is scheduled to fight Dae Hwan Kim.

Results

Road to ONE 6: WSS (Cancelled)

Road to ONE 6: WSS was expected to be a Muay Thai event held by ONE Championship in partnership with World Siam Stadium (WSS) at the World Siam Stadium in Bangkok, Thailand. The event was cancelled due to the COVID-19 pandemic.

Background
The event was expected to take place at the World Siam Stadium in Bangkok, Thailand on December 25. However, on December 21,  the event was cancelled due to the COVID-19 pandemic.

The sixth edition of Road to ONE was supposed to be composed solely of muay thai bouts, the former WBC Muaythai 147 lb champion Luis Cajaiba and the current Lumpinee Stadium 160 lb champion Sorgraw Petchyindee was planned to headline the event.

Fight Card

See also
 2020 in UFC 
 Bellator MMA in 2020
 2020 in Rizin Fighting Federation 
 2020 in Konfrontacja Sztuk Walki
 2020 in Absolute Championship Akhmat
 2020 in Fight Nights Global
 2020 in M-1 Global 
 2020 in Road FC 
 2020 in Glory
 2020 in K-1
 2020 in Kunlun Fight
 2020 in Romanian kickboxing
 2020 in Wu Lin Feng

References

External links
ONE Championship

ONE Championship events
ONE Championship events
2020 sport-related lists
2020 in kickboxing
2020 in mixed martial arts